Sanawal is a village in Ramchandarpur Tehsil in Balrampur District of Chattissgarh State of India. It is located 119 km towards North from  Ambikapur.

References

Villages in Balrampur district, Chhattisgarh